Chaplynka is an urban-type settlement in Kakhovka Raion, Kherson Oblast, southern Ukraine. It hosts the administration of the Chaplynka settlement hromada, one of the hromadas of Ukraine. It had a population of  In early 2022, the settlement of Chaplynka came under the scope of the temporary Russian occupation and Russianization efforts that started at that time as part of the Russian invasion of Ukraine.

Administrative status 
Until 18 July, 2020, Chaplynka was the administrative center of Chaplynka Raion. The raion was abolished in July 2020 as part of the administrative reform of Ukraine, which reduced the number of raions of Kherson Oblast to five. The area of Chaplynka Raion was merged into Kakhovka Raion.

History 
To the south of the town is Chaplynka airfield which as of August 2022 was being used as a Russian Armed Forces airbase against Ukraine as part of the 2022 Russian invasion of Ukraine. After the Ukrainians recaptured Kherson in November, bringing Chaplynka within range of HIMARS strikes, the Russian aviation relocated to Berdiansk Airport.

References

External links
 The murder of the Jews of Chaplynka during World War II, at Yad Vashem website.

Urban-type settlements in Kakhovka Raion
Russia–Ukraine border crossings
Dneprovsky Uyezd
Holocaust locations in Ukraine